This article contains the discography of jazz pianist Oscar Peterson. Albums should be listed by date of initial release not recording session dates.

Albums

Filmography
 1978 The Silent Partner (Movie Score)
 1996 Life of A Legend (View Video) 
 1998 London: 1964 (Vidjazz)
 2004 Music in the Key of Oscar (View Video)
 2004 Easter Suite for Jazz Trio (TDK)
 2004 A Night in Vienna (Verve)
 2004 Norman Granz' Jazz in Montreux Presents Oscar Peterson Trio '77 (Eagle Vision USA)
 2007 The Berlin Concert (Inakustik)
 2007 Reunion Blues (Salt Peanuts)
 2008 Oscar Peterson & Count Basie: Together in Concert 1974 (Impro-Jazz Spain)
 2008 Jazz Icons: Oscar Peterson Live in '63, '64 & '65 (Jazz Icons)
 2014 During This Time: Oscar Peterson, Ben Webster. NDR Jazzworkshop 1972 (art of groove)
 2020 Oscar Peterson: Black + White

References

External links
Jazz Discography Project
Discogs entry

Peterson, Oscar
Discographies of Canadian artists